Antenna (Hangul: 안테나) is a South Korean record label founded by You Hee-yeol of the band Toy in 1997. Formerly an independent label, it was fully incorporated as a subsidiary under Kakao Entertainment in August 2021.

History 
South Korean musician You Hee-yeol, known as Toy, founded the indie record label Toy Music in 1997. In the following decade, the label published several albums by artists including Lucid Fall, Kim Yeon-woo, Dear Cloud, and You Hee-yeol himself.

In 2007, the label's name was changed to Antenna Music. The modern electronic band Peppertones signed under Antenna Music in 2008, followed by pianist Jung Jae-hyung following completion of his degree from the École Normale de Musique de Paris, and singer-songwriter Park Sae-byul.

From 2013 to 2017, You Hee-yeol served as a judge on Seasons 3–6 of the reality television competition show K-pop Star. During this time, Sam Kim, Kwon Jin-ah, Jung Seung-hwan, Lee Jin-ah and Lee Soo-jung signed to the label after successfully auditioning for the program and finishing in the top three of their respective seasons.

In May 2021, Kakao Entertainment acquired 19% of Antenna's shares, establishing a strategic partnership between the two companies. On July 14, it was announced that Antenna had signed television personality Yoo Jae-suk, the first non-musician to be managed by the label. On August 17, Kakao acquired Antenna's remaining shares, making it a fully owned subsidiary. On November 17, it was announced that Antenna had signed former Lovelyz member Mijoo.

Artists

Groups 
 Toy
 Peppertones

Soloists 
 Lucid Fall
 Jung Jae-hyung
 Park Sae-byul
 Sam Kim
 Kwon Jin-ah
 Jung Seung-hwan
 Lee Jin-ah
 Yun Seok-cheol
 
 
 Lee Hyori

Entertainer 
 Yoo Jae-suk
 Mijoo

Producer 
 Seo Dong-hwan
 Hwang Hyeon-jo

Former artists 
 
 Kim Yeon-woo
 Lee Soo-jung (Chai)

References

External links
 

South Korean independent record labels
Pop record labels
Record labels established in 1997
Labels distributed by CJ E&M Music and Live
Labels distributed by Kakao M